John Denver Trending  is a 2019 Filipino independent drama film directed and written by Arden Rod Condez, and starring Jansen Magpusao and Meryll Soriano. This budget-limited film was entirely shot in the Municipality of Pandan, in Antique, Philippines. John Denver Trending won the Carlos Palanca Memorial Awards for Screenplay in Filipino. The movie also competed at the 24th Busan International Film Festival alongside other films from Kyrgyzstan, China, Iran, Taiwan, India, Vietnam, South Korea, and Japan, and is part of the BIFF's New Currents section held from October 3 to 12 October 2019 at the Busan Cinema Center.

John Denver Trending was also screened on March 19, 2021 at Filmgarde Cineplexes Bugis as a part of a series of films shown during the Happiness Film Festival Singapore.

As of November 2022, the Film Development Council of the Philippines (FDCP) has recently announced that John Denver Trending is “the first Filipino film to be released with wide screenings throughout South Korea.

Plot
In Pandan, Antique, 14-year old student John Denver Cabungcal studies in Sta. Ines Catholic High School. On February 18, after practicing a dance for Director's Day, he goes to a classroom to take his bag and leave. A peer named Carlos Samulde immediately accuses him of stealing Makoy's iPad, which was supposedly in the classroom. When John denies, a fight ensues, and another peer records John beating Carlos, posted on Facebook without context. Having overheard the plan, John learns that the post has gone viral, with unanimous condemnation against him and his abroad father expressing disappointment.

The next day, Makoy's mother takes this to the school principal's and police's notice. John continues pleading innocent, but Carlos argues the rest otherwise in convincing fashion, conspiring that this stems from Makoy's bullying towards John. When John's mother is made aware of this, his bad discipline record was noted. She nevertheless sides with her son, saying that when he lies, his nose swells. The school announces an investigation team, and more hate is being directed towards John, culminating in several students beating him up.

With more bullying and national broadcasts, John's depression intensifies. The local mayor speculates that he is a troubled teen. The next day, John learns that Carlos edited a video discussing John to make it seemingly supporting the notion that he stole the iPad. He is brought to the police station, where he tearfully pleads innocent, prompting the policeman to scold him, claiming all evidences point him as the culprit. John escapes from the police station, flees to his house and commits suicide by hanging. His mother questions his presence, walking home after being reassured that the school will contact police for updates.

Cast

Main cast
 Jansen Magpusao as John Denver Cabungcal
 Meryll Soriano as Marites Cabungcal, the mother of John Denver Cabungcal
Supporting cast

Reception
The film has received critical acclaim in the Philippines. Based on the review of Fred Hawson published in ABS-CBN News, "This film was indeed a very powerful and timely statement against bullying—physically and verbally in person, or virtually online. It talked about the dangerous power of social media in shaping public perception and opinion with biased news or worse, fake news, and its unrelenting negative consequences for the victim involved. New director Arden Rod Condez approached the topic with utmost severity of focus. Several prior scenes may have been foreshadowing the ending, but it will still knock your breath away.

Oggs Cruz of Rappler writes, "Arden Rod Condez’s John Denver Trending will most likely be beloved not just for its currency but also for its unsubtle messaging. In a world that has been drastically made smaller by social media, a film that puts at the center of its concerns the glaring dangers of the conveniences of virtual connections is not just pertinent, but also important."

While, Wanggo Gallaga of ClickTheCity critics the film favorably citing that, "‘John Denver Trending’ captures a very real situation in today’s world of online witch hunts and slander. The film even manages to impress upon us the importance of its setting by including an actual witch hunt that serves to remind us that there is no difference between the dark age practice with what is happening in the very contemporary act of witch hunts online. ‘John Denver Trending’ is as painful as it is sobering and truly illuminates the horrors of mob mentality and blindly believing on hearsay. This is a powerful film that, through fine craftsmanship, manages to maximize the rawness of its players and filmmaking style to create a truly moving piece that is both relevant and resonant to these trying times."

CNN Philippines via film reviewers Gil Perez and Don Jaucian writes, "what’s most harrowing about “John Denver Trending” is how it is not preachy at all. For a subject as rife as fake news, online toxicity, and cyberbullying, director Arden Rod Condez does not hit his audience over the head with heavy-handed commentary. Rather, the film’s sequence of events feels organic. It’s the natural cascade we are well-aware of in real life but do not often see up close. This nonchalant presentation makes the film all the more powerful, making audiences silently confront their own complicity and culpability."

For Stephanie Mayo of Tribune she notes that, "John Denver Trending, this year’s Cinemalaya Best Feature Film, is mandatory viewing. It’s a provocative film, sharpened by Rommel Sales’ exquisite cinematography. It’s a powerful reminder to everyone and inspires a moral imperative to follow the Biblical teaching of watching your words. The film also inspires something else: an open communication between parent and child. A child should never hesitate to open up or approach a parent. A parent should never be too busy to ask a child how he is. And the life-saving importance of teaching our children hope and resilience in this cruel, cruel world."

J. Neil Garcia of GMA News commends this movie writing in his review that, "A clear strength of the film is its rural and “regional” world, with its culturally simultaneous reality being succinctly captured in the depiction of communal faith healers paradoxically coexisting with smart phones, thereby suggesting not so much rupture as continuity between the regime of memory and the regime of data, especially where the residual but entirely determinative power of orality is concerned."

Another review from Kean Planas of MyReelThoughts.com rated 10 out of 10 writing, "John Denver Trending is such a powerful film with an extremely important message to tell. Words cannot even explain how deeply affected I am by it. The ending gave me goosebumps like no other film in this year’s line-up has given me. Go see it, it will change your perspective on life and the world we currently live in after. It’s one of Cinemalaya’s best, one of this year’s best films, even."

And, blogger Nazamel Tabares of PelikulaMania.com grades a 5 out 5 stars to this film citing that, "...it’s amazing how focused his storytelling is. How effective and how brilliant he delivers his messages through this film. And I applaud him for that."

Accolades

References

External links
 'John Denver Trending' tops Cinemalaya awards
 Cinemalaya review: 'John Denver Trending' delivers powerful message on bullying
 

2019 films
Films set in Antique (province)
Philippine psychological drama films
Films about lying
Films about school violence
Films about social media
Films about cyberbullying
Procedural films
Cinemalaya films
Visayan-language films